The 2006 Southampton Council election took place on 4 May 2006 to elect members of Southampton Unitary Council in Hampshire, England. One third of the council was up for election and the council stayed under no overall control.

After the election, the composition of the council was:
Liberal Democrat 16
Labour 16
Conservative 16

Campaign
Before the election the Liberal Democrats formed the administration of the council with 17 seats, compared to 16 for the Conservatives and 15 for Labour.

Issues in the election included refuse collection, the condition of the pavements and anti-social behaviour. The Labour and Liberal Democrat parties clashed over anti-social behaviour, with the parties disagreeing over whether the Liberal Democrat led council was doing enough to tackle such behaviour. The campaign saw national politicians joining in, such as Labour's Hazel Blears and Liberal Democrat Simon Hughes.

The election also had two independents standing on a platform calling for the chairman of Southampton F.C. Rupert Lowe to resign.

Election result
The results saw all 3 main parties end the election with 16 seats, after Labour gained 1 seat from the Liberal Democrats. Meanwhile, the independents calling for Rupert Lowe to resign as chairman of Southampton F.C. received 200 and 63 votes each. Overall turnout in the election was 31.3%.

Following the election the 3 parties were unable to reach agreement on who should become leader of the council, with a five-hour council meeting on 18 May failing to reach a conclusion. Finally Liberal Democrat Adrian Vinson continued as council leader for another year.

Ward results

Bargate

Bassett

Bevois

Bitterne

Bitterne Park

Coxford

Freemantle

Harefield

Millbrook

Peartree

Portswood

Redbridge

Shirley

Sholing

Swaythling

Woolston

References

2006 English local elections
2006
2000s in Southampton